Martha D Lewis (aka Martha Lewis and Martha Demetri Lewis) (born 1967 in London) is a British Born Cypriot Performing and Recording artist regularly performing in the Contemporary Jazz and World Music scene in the UK and Europe. She is also a Presenter, Broadcaster, Composer, Multi-Instrumentalist and Educator.
Lewis' work combines Mediterranean and other world musical influences with Jazz and electronica. 
Lewis is Patron of the Leukaemia Cancer Society UK for which she has produced and performed many fundraisers, ongoing. Lewis' musical work is included in the British Library. In 2018, Lewis gained a Master's degree in Songwriting.

Early years to Present Day
Martha was born and raised in London to Greek Cypriot immigrant parents. At 7 years old she studied guitar and voice and formed a semi-pro covers band at the age of 14 years. 
She went on to study Music at Middlesex University, where she also studied "Opera singing" for 3 years.

After graduating Martha's career was launched as part of a group representing Cyprus in the Eurovision Song Contest in Luxembourg .

Martha's went on to form the award-winning music-comedy duo Donna & Kebab in the early 1990s. This long term and ongoing creative partnership with singer musician actress Eve Polycarpou rapidly accumulated TV, radio and theatre credits. The duo have  toured throughout UK Europe and Middle East .
In 1995, 'Donna & Kebab' renamed as Martha and Eve. The duo focused their attention on their prolific songwriting skills and have recorded three albums, a club single and a DVD of their show 'Live at the Hackney Empire'. This creative partnership continues.

Martha's solo project was launched in 1999 following a commission by The Arts Council of Great Britain for a 30-minute musical work, this work was broadcast by BBC Radio 3 in its entirety  and began her journey as a composer . Martha has since received numerous commissions for music work including further works from the Arts Council, PRS foundation, London Arts Board,  music festivals, a short film Silences; theatre plays Mrs Ruskin, Lucrezia; title and incidental music for Channel 4 documentaries Midlife , "Mind".

Martha has released two CD's as a solo artist. Martha D Lewis-Cafe Aman-Double Life released in 2007 and voted 'Best of 2007' releases by BBC Radio London's 'A World In London' audiences. 
Lewis’ most recent large scale project was as a singer and presenter in the globally released feature film documentary 'My Sweet Canary', about the life and music of the first Lady of the Greek Blues - Roza Eskenazy. 
Following Lewis’ participation in the film, she released her second solo CD in 2015 Homage To Roza, an album of contemporary interpretations and arrangements of classic Greek Blues, specifically Eskenazy repertoire, from 1920s to the 1950s . 
This CD featured legendary drummer Jack De Johnette who played drums on the 1927 rembetika classic entitled Misirlou. 
Martha's previous 2010 release of ‘Misirlou’  was featured on the ‘Best of European Jazz 2010’ compilation for The London Jazz Festival.

Martha presented a documentary on 'BBC Radio 3' entitled A Journey Into Rembetika-Music of the Outsiders

Discography

Martha and Eve (1996)

Je t’aime / Don’t talk (1999) Club 12" Single

Martha and Eve Stay (2000)

Martha and Eve Absolutely Live (2006)

Martha D Lewis  Café Aman - Double Life  (2007)

Martha D Lewis Homage To Roza  (2015)

On Film 
My Sweet Canary (2011) Feature film documentary.

Martha and Eve - Live show at the Hackney Empire  DVD filmed by TVS. (1993)

Industry awards
Best Newcomer - Time Out Award :: 
Martha D Lewis - 'Double Life'CD voted Best of 2007 Releases - BBC Radio London :: 
Life Time Achievement Award – BBC Greek London Radio

References
http://marthalewis.co.uk
http://marthaandeve.co.uk
My Sweet Canary
http://mysweetcanary.com
http://leukaemiacancersociety.org
 'Homage To Roza' CD: https://itunes.apple.com/gb/album/homage-to-roza/927027511
 'Martha D Lewis-Cafe Aman - Double Life' CD: https://itunes.apple.com/us/album/café-aman-double-life/266120696
 BBC Radio 3 documentary A Journey Into Rembetika – Music of the Outsiders, Broadcast onBBC Radio 3–23 August 2004 http://genome.ch.bbc.co.uk/1d21abf2623346cf814a1e6e7877a8fa

1967 births
Living people
British people of Cypriot descent
British jazz musicians